Dixie, Virginia may refer to:
Dixie, Fluvanna County, Virginia, an unincorporated community
Dixie, Mathews County, Virginia, an unincorporated community